AS Ponta Leste is a football club based in Dili, East Timor. The team plays in the Liga Futebol Amadora in the Primeira Divisão. The club's most successful season came in 2016 in which the team won the 2016 Taça 12 de Novembro after beating Assalam FC 1-0 in the final, as well as the Super Taça which they won against league champions Benfica Laulara 2-1. Since then however the team has yet to win any further competitions. 

The club owned by Inácio Moreira the Vice-Minister of Public Works, Transport and Communications of Timor Leste and Osório Florindo the vice-President of Federação de Futebol de Timor-Leste.

Squad 
As of August 2020

Coach: Eduardo Pereira

Competition records

Liga Futebol Amadora 
2016: 5th place
2017: Runners Up
2018: 4th place
2019: 3rd place

Taça 12 de Novembro
2016: Champions
2017: Quarter-finals
2018: Semi-finals
2019: 1/8 Finals

LFA Super Taça
2016: Champions

Copa FFTL 

 2020: Quarter-finals

References

Football clubs in East Timor
Football
Sport in Dili
Association football clubs established in 1991
1991 establishments in East Timor